Zipi y Zape are the names of two Spanish comic book characters created by José Escobar in 1947, and of their eponymous strip. Their name is derived from the Spanish word zipizape, meaning "turmoil" or "chaos."

Chapter
Zipi and Zape Zapatilla are two young twins who do poorly in school. Mischievous and energetic, they are fans of football. They are distinguished merely by their hair colour: Zipi is blond, Zape black-haired. Other featured characters are their father, Don Pantuflo Zapatilla, a professor of Philately and Colombophilia (pantuflo/a and zapatilla are both Spanish names for slippers); their mother, the hard-pressed Doña Jaimita; Don Minervo, their strict teacher; Peloto, the teacher's pet (and thus the twins’ enemy); Sapientín (sometimes called "Pitagorin", as a reference to Pithagoras), their genius cousin and Pepe and Felisa Plómez, the extremely annoying friends of their parents, whose undesirable visits they try to avoid or cut short.

Their stories are usually short, about one to eight pages long, but occasionally some are longer, about 44 or 48 pages, like "El tonel del tiempo" (The barrel of time) o "El laboratorio secreto" (The secret laboratory). They are humorous, based on the twins antics and their effects, since often they backfire spectacularly, including popular culture elements like aliens and mad scientists.

Publication history
Escobar's stories were published by Editorial Bruguera in the Pulgarcito magazine, which contained several comic strips. They later got their own magazine, ZipiZape, which also contained several comic strips apart from the title one. The strips were later compiled in softcover and hardcover albums. When Bruguera went bankrupt, its catalogue was bought by Ediciones B, the current owners of the characters rights. These vintage stories can be found in softcover under the "Colección Olé" label and in hardcover under the "Super Humor" label.

The series continues after Escobar's death, now in the hands of cartoonists Juan Carlos Ramis and Joaquín Cera who have put them forward to the 21st century. Zipi and Zape are still domestic terrorists, but now are fans of the UEFA Champions League and make good use of the Internet. Their stories are published directly on hardcover albums under the "Magos del Humor" label. Several of these albums are later collected in the wider, hardcover "Super Humor" albums.

Merchandise
The popularity of Zipi y Zape has resulted in merchandise, including video games, an animated TV show in 2003 and two live-action movies, Las aventuras de Zipi y Zape, in 1981 and Zip & Zap and the Marble Gang, in 2013. José Escobar made some films which projected in his invention, Cine Skob.

External links

 

Twin characters in comics
Comics characters introduced in 1947
1947 comics debuts
Spanish comic strips
Spanish comics titles
Fictional Spanish people
Spanish comics characters
Comic strip duos
Child characters in comics
Gag-a-day comics
Humor comics
School-themed comics
Spanish comics adapted into films
Comics adapted into television series
Comics adapted into animated series
Comics adapted into video games